Alvarado (officially: Ilustre, Heroica y Generosa Ciudad y Puerto de Alvarado) is a city in the Mexican state of Veracruz. The city also serves as the municipal seat for the surrounding municipality of the same name. Alvarado is bordered by Boca del Río, Tlalixcoyan, Medellín, Ignacio de la Llave, Ciudad Lerdo de Tejada, Tlacotalpan and Acula. It lies in the so-called "Region Papaloapan" bordered on the south by the municipalities of Acula, Tlacotalpan and Lerdo de Tejada, on the east by the Gulf of Mexico and on the west by Ignacio de la Llave.

The INEGI said that the population by 2000 was 22,608 people.

Alvarado was founded in the 16th century. In 1518, Pedro de Alvarado arrived to Atlizintla. In 1563, Juan de Sahagún  built a port in the area to supply the Port of Veracuz. The locality started being known as San Cristóbal de Alvarado from 1600 onwards. 

Major products of Alvarado are coffee, fruits, and sugar. The economy of this region is based on fishing and farming. Sugar cane and coffee are common products of this region.

References

External links
  

Populated places in Veracruz
Populated places established in 1518